Margaret Scobey (born c. 1949) is an American diplomat and former United States Ambassador to Egypt and United States Ambassador to Syria.

Biography
Scobey graduated from Immaculate Conception High School in Memphis, Tennessee in 1967.  She earned a B.A. and an M.A. in history from the University of Tennessee in Knoxville. Scobey pursued doctoral studies in history at the University of Michigan in Ann Arbor.

As a United States Foreign Service Officer, Scobey served at the U.S. embassies in many Middle and Near Eastern countries. She was the Deputy Chief of Mission in Riyadh, Saudi Arabia, from September 2001 to November 2003, before receiving her first appointment as ambassador, to Syria. She was recalled from Syria in 2005 after the assassination of the Lebanese Prime Minister Rafiq Hariri. Scobey served as Political Counselor in Baghdad from 2006 to 2007.

In February 2008, she was nominated and confirmed as the U.S. Ambassador to Egypt.

In February 2011, she spoke with Mohamed ElBaradei, telling him:

The U.S. is interested in a political change in Egypt, but that the US government won't dictate the path which Cairo must follow."

References

External links
Embassy biography
"Roundtable on President Obama’s Speech The Faculty of Economics and Political Science, Cairo University", July 8, 2009

"Margaret Scobey, U.S Ambassador in Cairo, Egypt", Soundcloud, March 21, 2011

"Meeting with Ambassador Margaret Scobey", Huffington Post, Dal LaMagna, July 1, 2007
"Margaret Scobey, the current United States Ambassador", Yahoo News

1940s births
Living people
Ambassadors of the United States to Syria
Ambassadors of the United States to Egypt
American women ambassadors
People from Memphis, Tennessee
University of Tennessee alumni
University of Michigan alumni
United States Foreign Service personnel
21st-century American women